Gates to Paradise is a 1968 film by Polish director Andrzej Wajda. The film is set in medieval France and is based on a novel by Polish writer Jerzy Andrzejewski (1960) that seeks to expose the motives behind youthful religious zeal. It was entered into the 18th Berlin International Film Festival.

Synopsis
In 1212, a Children's Crusade is launched after Jakob (John Fordyce) claims to have had a vision in which it is said that the innocence of children would be able to liberate Jerusalem. A monk (Lionel Stander), returning from Jerusalem, joins the crusade and hears the children's confessions, gradually realizing that most of them are taking part not for religious, but for more worldly reasons, like rejected love.

Both Alexander (Mathieu Carrière) and Bianca (Pauline Challoner) are in love with Jakob. Alexander, who has learned that his adoptive father (and his lover), Count Ludwig (Ferdy Mayne), also a crusader, had killed Alexander's Greek parents, is gleeful that Jakob is in love with the count, whom he had met after the count and Alexander had split after an argument. This allows Alexander to take revenge for the count's infidelity by telling his beloved Jakob about the count's recent demise by drowning in a river, watched by an unmoved Alexander.

Finally, it is revealed in Jakob's confession that Jakob received the inspiration for the crusade not from God but from the Count, which means that the crusade must fail because it is not by the will of God. However, the monk is unable to stop the children's progression and is left behind.

Cast
 Lionel Stander – Monk
 Ferdy Mayne – Count Ludovic de Vendôme
 Mathieu Carrière – Alexis Melissen
 Pauline Challoner – Blanche
 John Fordyce – Jacques de Cloyes
 Jenny Agutter – Maud de Cloyes
 Dragomir Felba – Crusader 1
 Denis Gilmore – Robert (as Dennis Gilmore)
 Gojko Kovačević – Crusader 2
 Ljabomir Radavic – Crusader 3
 Kynaston Reeves – Superior
 Janez Vrhovec – François

See also
List of historical drama films

References

External links
 

1968 drama films
1968 LGBT-related films
1968 films
British drama films
British LGBT-related films
English-language Polish films
English-language Yugoslav films
Films directed by Andrzej Wajda
Polish drama films
Polish LGBT-related films
Yugoslav LGBT-related films
Films set in the 13th century
Crusades films
Media about the Children's Crusade
Films based on Polish novels
1960s English-language films
1960s British films